Luke Parker (born 25 October 1992) is a professional Australian rules footballer who plays for the Sydney Swans in the Australian Football League (AFL). He plays as a midfielder. 

Originally from Langwarrin, Victoria, Parker played for the Dandenong Stingrays before being drafted by Sydney with the 40th pick in the 2010 National Draft. He made his senior debut in round eight of the 2011 season, and quickly established himself in the line-up. Parker won a premiership in his second season, and has since played in three more losing grand finals (in 2014, 2016 and 2022). He won the Bob Skilton Medal as Sydney's best and fairest player in 2014, 2017 and 2021. He also finished runner-up to Patrick Dangerfield in the 2016 Brownlow Medal, a season in which he was also named in the All-Australian team for the first time.

Early life
Parker grew up in Langwarrin, Victoria, on Melbourne's south-eastern outskirts. He played both basketball and football as a youngster, eventually choosing to pursue the latter at the age of 16. In the TAC Cup, Parker played for the Dandenong Stingrays and won the club best and fairest in his first season. He made the TAC Cup Team of the Year in 2010, although he broke his jaw in the competition's preliminary final. Parker also played for Victoria Country in the 2010 AFL Under 18 Championships.

Parker was educated at St Peter’s Catholic College in Cranbourne West.

AFL career
Parker was drafted by Sydney with the club's second pick (and 40th overall) in the 2010 National Draft. He made his debut in Round 8 of the 2011 AFL season against . He received his first career Brownlow Medal vote in the Swans' Round 16 victory over the Gold Coast Suns where he had 26 disposals and kicked two goals, helping the side to its first win on the Gold Coast for twenty-four years.

It was an impressive debut year from Parker playing as small, tackling forward and in the midfield. He was compared to his teammate Jude Bolton, due to his hardness at the contest, strong tackling and ability to win contested possession.

The young midfielder took a significant step forward in 2013, moving from a regular substitute at the back end of the previous season to a dangerous and highly valued member of the starting line-up. Playing every game, he averaged 21 disposals and five marks and proved a more than handy forward, finishing with 22 goals.

In 2014, Parker further made his mark on the team becoming the youngest player since Michael O'Loughlin in 1998 to be awarded the Bob Skilton Medal recognised by the coaches as the Swans' Best and Fairest. He also won the Paul Kelly Players’ Player award which is voted on each week by the playing group.

In 2015, Parker became a member of the leadership group, at just 22 years of age. His courage and determination on the field was recognised by his peers, as Parker won the Robert Rose Award for the AFL’s Most Courageous Player. Unfortunately his season ended prematurely when he suffered a fractured fibula when had his right leg twist awkwardly in a tackle against Collingwood in round 20.

Parker made a strong comeback in 2016, being awarded the Brett Kirk Medal (best on ground in the Sydney Derby) in round three. He won the Most Courageous Player award for the second year running and polled second in the Brownlow Medal with 26 votes, only beaten by Patrick Dangerfield of the Geelong Cats. He was also rewarded with his first ever All Australian honours in a career best season.

Parker had a consistent year in 2017, averaging 25.4 disposals a game. After the Swans lost their first six games of the season, they would then only lose two of their last sixteen home-and-away matches. Parker's role in the Swans' form turnaround was particularly prominent, once again winning the Bob Skilton Medal.

Statistics
Updated to the end of the 2022 season.

|-
| 2011 ||  || 26
| 13 || 8 || 8 || 71 || 81 || 152 || 28 || 24 || 0.6 || 0.6 || 5.5 || 6.2 || 11.7 || 2.2 || 1.8 || 1
|- 
| scope=row bgcolor=F0E68C | 2012# ||  || 26
| 19 || 5 || 5 || 140 || 164 || 304 || 54 || 53 || 0.3 || 0.3 || 7.4 || 8.6 || 16.0 || 2.8 || 2.8 || 4
|-
| 2013 ||  || 26
| 25 || 22 || 12 || 265 || 259 || 524 || 76 || 125 || 0.9 || 0.5 || 10.6 || 10.4 || 21.0 || 3.0 || 5.0 || 0
|- 
| 2014 ||  || 26
| 25 || 25 || 14 || 286 || 362 || 648 || 104 || 151 || 1.0 || 0.6 || 11.4 || 14.5 || 25.9 || 4.2 || 6.0 || 12
|-
| 2015 ||  || 26
| 19 || 18 || 14 || 219 || 267 || 486 || 65 || 40 || 1.2 || 0.8 || 11.6 || 14.5 || 26.1 || 4.0 || 5.0 || 9
|- 
| 2016 ||  || 26
| 26 || 25 || 18 || 330 || 369 || 699 || 90 || 170 || 1.0 || 0.7 || 12.7 || 14.2 || 26.9 || 3.5 || 6.5 || 26
|-
| 2017 ||  || 26
| 24 || 14 || 17 || 304 || 304 || 608 || 85 || 134 || 0.6 || 0.7 || 12.7 || 12.7 || 25.3 || 3.5 || 5.6 || 16
|-
| 2018 ||  || 26
| 22 || 25 || 9 || 261 || 245 || 506 || 88 || 123 || 1.1 || 0.4 || 11.9 || 11.1 || 23.0 || 4.0 || 5.6 || 10
|-
| 2019 ||  || 26
| 22 || 13 || 7 || 302 || 256 || 558 || 91 || 114 || 0.6 || 0.3 || 13.7 || 11.6 || 25.4 || 4.1 || 5.2 || 16
|-
| 2020 ||  || 26
| 17 || 6 || 5 || 190 || 187 || 377 || 54 || 84 || 0.3 || 0.3 || 11.2 || 11.0 || 22.2|| 3.2 || 4.9 || 15
|-
| 2021 ||  || 26
| 23 || 15 || 8 || 298 || 343 || 641 || 87 || 106 || 0.6 || 0.3 || 13.0 || 14.9 || 27.9 || 3.8 || 4.6 || 17
|-
| 2022 ||  || 26
| 25 || 14 || 10 || 320 || 291 || 611 || 103 || 150 || 0.6 || 0.4 || 12.8 || 11.6 || 24.4 || 4.1 || 6.0 || 16
|- class=sortbottom
! colspan=3 | Career
! 260 !! 190 !! 127 !! 2986 !! 3128 !! 6114 !! 925 !! 1324 !! 0.7 !! 0.5 !! 11.5 !! 12.0 !! 23.5 !! 3.6 !! 5.1 !! 142
|}

Honours and achievements
Team
 AFL premiership player: 2012
 2× McClelland Trophy: 2014, 2016

Individual
 Sydney captain: 2019–
 3× Bob Skilton Medal: 2014, 2017, 2021
 All-Australian team: 2016
 2× Robert Rose Award (AFLPA Most Courageous Player): 2015, 2016
 2× 22under22 team: 2016, 2017
 5× Brett Kirk Medal: 2016 (round 12), 2020 (round 12), 2021 (round 18), 2022 (round 1), 2022 (round 20)

References

External links

1992 births
Living people
Sydney Swans players
Sydney Swans Premiership players
Dandenong Stingrays players
Australian rules footballers from Melbourne
Bob Skilton Medal winners
All-Australians (AFL)
One-time VFL/AFL Premiership players
AFL Academy graduates
People from the City of Frankston